Wuhan Institute of Design and Sciences (Chinese: 武汉设计工程学院), formerly Chutian College of Huazhong Agricultural University (华中农业大学楚天学院) is a private university in Jiangxia District, Wuhan, China. It was initially established in 2006 as an affiliate college of Huazhong Agricultural University. It provides education in Food, Pharmaceutical, Art and Design, Information Technology, Business, etc. In March 2015, the school separated from its host university and changed to its current name.

The lavish Western Gothic style library of the school cost CNY 50 million to build, which incited the students to question whether it was worthwhile.

External links
Official Website

References

Universities and colleges in Wuhan